Vasaloppet Japan is a cross-country skiing event held around Asahikawa on the island of Hokkaido in northern Japan. The event has been held since 1981. and has been named after Vasaloppet in Sweden.

References 

1981 establishments in Japan
February sporting events
Hokkaido
Recurring sporting events established in 1981
Skiing in Japan
Ski marathons
Sports competitions in Japan
Winter events in Japan